Peter IV of Alexandria may refer to:

 Pope Peter IV of Alexandria, ruled in 565–569
 Patriarch Peter IV of Alexandria, Greek Patriarch of Alexandria in 643–651